is a railway station in the town of Onagawa, Miyagi Prefecture, Japan, operated by East Japan Railway Company (JR East).

Lines
Urashuku Station is served by the Ishinomaki Line, and is located 37.0 kilometers from the terminus of the line at Kogota Station. From the 2011 Tōhoku earthquake and tsunami of March 11, 2011 until March 21, 2015, services past Urashuku were suspended, making Urashuku Station the effective terminus of the line.

Station layout
The station has one side platform, serving traffic in both directions. The station is unattended.

History
Urashuku Station opened on February 12, 1956. The station was absorbed into the JR East network upon the privatization of JNR on April 1, 1987. Operations of the line and the station were suspended by the 2011 Tōhoku earthquake and tsunami of March 11, 2011. Services were resumed on March 16, 2013; but remained suspended on the portion from Urashuku to Onagawa until services resumed on March 21, 2015.

Adjacent stations 
 JR East
 Ishinomaki Line・Senseki-Tohoku Line
 Rapid・Local
  - Sta.Urashuku -

Surrounding area

Mangoku-Ura lake

Gallery

See also
 List of railway stations in Japan

External links

 

Railway stations in Miyagi Prefecture
Ishinomaki Line
Railway stations in Japan opened in 1956
Onagawa, Miyagi
Stations of East Japan Railway Company